Seikh may refer to:

 a historical variant of Sikh
 a variant spelling of Sheikh